Wilfred Williams is an Australian former professional rugby league footballer who played in the 1980s. He played for Eastern Suburbs, Western Suburbs and St. George and in the NSWRL competition.

Background
Williams is the father of former rugby league player Joe Williams.

Playing career
In 1984, Williams represented NSW Country against NSW City. Williams made his first grade debut for Eastern Suburbs in round 1 of the 1985 NSWRL season against arch rivals South Sydney. Williams played from the bench in a 34-16 loss. In 1986, Williams signed for Western Suburbs and made 22 appearances as the club finished second last on the table. Williams played one final season in the NSWRL with St. George in 1987.

References

1960 births
Western Suburbs Magpies players
Sydney Roosters players
St. George Dragons players
Australian rugby league players
Country New South Wales rugby league team players
Rugby league centres
Rugby league wingers
Living people